The Philippines participated in the 1998 Asian Games held in Bangkok, Thailand from December 6 to December 20, 1998. Ranked 21st with one gold medal, five silver medals, and 12 bronze medals with a total of 18 over-all medals.

Asian Games Performance
It was a dismal harvest compared to four years ago. Billiards and Snooker players Romeo Villanueva and Gandy Valle captured the 9-ball doubles title to give the Philippines its first taste of gold. The country's first silver was earned by reigning world cudgel champion and Jakarta SEA games double gold medalist Mark Robert Rosales in the 3-event changquan. Rolly Chulhang settled for a silver in the men's 52-kg and below finals in sanshou for Wushu's second silver medal.

The Philippine Centennial team defeated Kazakhstan, 73-68, to salvage the bronze medal in basketball.

Medalists

The following Philippine competitors won medals at the Games.

Gold

Silver

Bronze

Multiple

Medal summary

Medal by sports

External links
 Philippine Olympic Committee official website

Nations at the 1998 Asian Games
1998
Asian Games